"Girlfriend" is the debut solo single by R&B singer Bobby Brown.  After being thrown out of R&B/pop group New Edition, Brown released his first album, King of Stage, from which the single was taken.  While the album failed to break the charts, the single went to number one on the R&B charts for two weeks and peaked at #57 on Billboard's Hot 100.

Track listing

A-Side
"Girlfriend - Extended version" (6:16)

B-Side
"King of Stage - Extended version" (7:15)

Charts

References

1986 debut singles
Bobby Brown songs
1986 songs